Enquirer or The Enquirer may refer to:
National Enquirer, an American supermarket tabloid newspaper
National Enquirer (1836), an American abolitionist newspaper from Pennsylvania
The Cincinnati Enquirer, an American newspaper from Ohio
Columbus Ledger-Enquirer, an American newspaper from Georgia

See also
Inquirer (disambiguation)